The 23nd Grand Prix des Frontières was a non-championship Formula Two motor race held on 24 May 1953 at the Chimay Street Circuit in Chimay, Belgium. The Grand Prix was won by Maurice Trintignant in a Gordini Type 16. Roger Laurent finished second in a Ferrari 500 and Fred Wacker was third in another Gordini Type 16.

Classification

Race

References

Grand Prix des Frontières
Frontières
Frontières
Frontières